was a streaming television series of documentaries revolving around Japanese kaiju and tokusatsu movies. The show was shot on location in Japan and generally featured interviews with filmmakers and movie-related events. Every episode was released bilingually for both Japanese- and English-speaking audiences.

The main series began in August 2012 and ended in December 2014, followed by the occasional special episode. It was produced by ACTV Japan (formerly under the "Gaijin Channel" brand until episode 13) in Tokyo, Japan, for the American website SciFi JAPAN.

List of episodes

See also
Tokusatsu
Kaiju

References

External links
 
 
 SciFi Japan
 
 

2012 web series debuts
YouTube original programming
Godzilla (franchise)
Ultra Series
Kaiju films
Giant monster films
Monster movies
Japanese-language films
Japanese entertainment terms